K-1 World Grand Prix 2010 in Seoul Final 16 was a martial arts event held by the K-1 on Saturday, October 2, 2010 at the Olympic Gymnastics Arena in Seoul, Korea. It was the Final Elimination tournament for top sixteen fighters. The winners qualified for the K-1 World Grand Prix 2010 Final held on December 11, 2010 at Yokohama Arena, Japan.

The eight finalists from K-1 World Grand Prix 2009 Final were automatically qualified, except Remy Bonjasky who could not compete.  The eighth spot was filled by K-1 Heavyweight champion, Keijiro Maeda then two World GP 2010 tournament winners from the Bucharest and Canberra. The last six spots were selected by fan voting.

Badr Hari did not enter the tournament for as yet unknown reasons, being replaced by Andrei Arlovski. On September 21, 2010, Michael Schiavello confirmed on his Twitter one last modification of the final card, Ray Sefo replaced Ruslan Karaev.
On September 28, 2010, Andrei Arlovski announced on Twitter that he would not fight in the tournament.
The Belarusian was replaced by Mighty Mo.

Final 16 Participating Fighters

Qualified 
  Semmy Schilt (K-1 World Grand Prix 2009 Final Champion)
  Alistair Overeem (2009 Grand Prix Semi Finalist)
  Ewerton Teixeira (2009 Grand Prix Quarter Finalist)
  Jerome Le Banner (2009 Grand Prix Quarter Finalist)
  Errol Zimmerman (2009 Grand Prix Quarter Finalist)
  Kyotaro (K-1 Heavyweight Champion)
  Freddy Kemayo (K-1 World Grand Prix 2010 in Bucharest Champion)
  Ben Edwards (K-1 World Grand Prix 2010 in Canberra Champion)

Wild cards 
  Peter Aerts
  Ray Sefo
  Daniel Ghiță
  Raul Cătinaș
  Gökhan Saki
  Tyrone Spong
  Hesdy Gerges
  Mighty Mo

Results

See also
List of K-1 events
List of K-1 champions
List of male kickboxers

References

External links
K-1 Official site

K-1 events
2010 in kickboxing
Kickboxing in South Korea
Sport in Seoul